William A. Douglas (born c. 1898) was a rugby union player who represented Australia.

Douglas was born in Sydney and claimed one international rugby cap for Australia.

References

Australian rugby union players
Australia international rugby union players
Rugby union players from Sydney